Spring Hope Historic District is a national historic district located at Spring Hope, Nash County, North Carolina.  It encompasses 159 contributing buildings and 1 contributing structure in the small railroad town of Spring Hope. The buildings primarily date to the 19th and early 20th century, and include notable examples of Late Victorian and Bungalow / American Craftsman style architecture.  Located in the district is the separately listed Dr. Hassell Brantley House.  Other notable buildings include former Wilmington and Weldon railroad station, Bluford-Brantley House, Sykes Seed Store, Spivey's General Merchandise, Citizens Bank (1908), A. F. May gasoline station (1923), Hill's Auto Service (1933-1934), Spring Hope Cotton Seed Oil Company, Joseph J. Spivey House, Cone-Brantley House (1887), Richardson-Chamblee House (1901), and Morgan-Vester House (1923).

It was listed on the National Register of Historic Places in 1988.

References

Historic districts on the National Register of Historic Places in North Carolina
Victorian architecture in North Carolina
Buildings and structures in Nash County, North Carolina
National Register of Historic Places in Nash County, North Carolina
1888 establishments in North Carolina